Graham is a surname of Scottish and English origin. It is typically an Anglo-French form of the name of the town of Grantham, in Lincolnshire, England. The settlement is recorded in the 11th century Domesday Book variously as Grantham, Grandham, Granham and Graham. This place name is thought to be derived from the Old English elements grand, possibly meaning "gravel", and ham, meaning "hamlet" the English word given to small settlements of smaller size than villages.

Variants and use
In the 12th century the surname was taken from England to Scotland by Sir William de Graham, who founded Clan Graham. Variant spellings are Grahame and Graeme. 

Its origin as a surname has led to its use as a given name, as for example in the case of Graham Cockburn, a daughter of Henry Cockburn, Lord Cockburn.
The surname is presently commonly used as a masculine given name (see Graham given name).

Notable people 
Alasdair Graham (1929–2015), Canadian politician, journalist, and businessman
Alasdair Graham (pianist) (1934–2016), British concert pianist
Alexander Graham (disambiguation), multiple people
Alexina Graham (born 1990), British fashion model
Sir Alistair Graham (born 1942), British politician
Andrew Graham (disambiguation), multiple people
Angus Charles Graham (1919–1991), British philosopher
Ann Graham (disambiguation), multiple people
Aubrey Drake Graham (born 1986), Canadian actor and rapper better known as Drake
B. L. Graham (1914–2001), American college basketball player and coach
Barbara Graham (1923–1955), American murderer
Ben Graham (disambiguation), multiple people
Bill Graham (disambiguation), multiple people
Bob Graham (disambiguation), multiple people
Brett Graham (born 1967), New Zealand sculptor
Bruce Graham (1925–2010), Colombian architect
Calvin Graham (1930–1992), American sailor
Charles Graham (disambiguation), multiple people
Charlotte Graham (born 1972), New Zealand artist
Cork Graham (born 1964), American author
Currie Graham (born 1967), Canadian actor
Dale Graham (born 1951), Canadian politician
Daniel Graham (disambiguation), multiple people
David Graham (disambiguation), multiple people
Derek Graham-Couch, Scottish professional wrestler
Devin Graham, American cinematographer, YouTuber
Dick Graham (1922–2013), English footballer and manager
Dirk Graham (born 1959), Canadian ice hockey player
Donald Graham (disambiguation), multiple people
Douglas Graham, 5th Duke of Montrose (1852–1925), Scottish nobleman
Edward Graham (disambiguation), multiple people
Enid Gordon Graham (1894–1974), Canadian physiotherapist
Eric Graham (1888–1964), Irish bishop
Evarts Ambrose Graham (1883–1957), American surgeon and professor
Eve Graham (born 1943), Scottish singer
Frank Graham (disambiguation), multiple people
Franklin Graham (born 1952), American evangelist
Gary Graham (born 1950), American actor
George Graham (disambiguation), multiple people
Gerald Graham (1831–1899), English soldier
Gerald S. Graham (1903–1988), Canadian-British imperial and naval historian
Gerrit Graham (born 1949), American actor and writer
Gwen Graham (born 1963), American politician
Harry Graham (disambiguation), multiple people
Heather Graham (actress) (born 1970), American actress
Helen Matthews (1857/8-?), also known by her pseudonym Mrs Graham, Scottish suffragette and footballer
Herol Graham (born 1958), British boxer
Hiram P. Graham (1820–1902), American politician
Ian Graham (disambiguation), multiple people
Jack Graham (disambiguation), multiple people
Jaeden Graham (born 1995), American football player
James Graham (disambiguation), multiple people
Jamie Graham, Canadian police chief
Jaymie Graham, Australian rules footballer
Jeff Graham, American football player
Jeff Graham (quarterback), American football player
John Graham (disambiguation), multiple people
Jorie Graham (born 1950), Pulitzer Prize–winning American poet
Joseph Graham (footballer) (1889–1968), English footballer
Julie Graham (born 1965), Scottish actress
Katharine Graham (1917–2001) (also known as Kay Graham), American publisher of The Washington Post, successor to her husband, Philip
Kathleen Margaret Graham (1913–2008), Canadian artist 
Kenny Graham (musician) (1924–1997), English jazz musician and composer
Kenny Graham (American football) (born 1941), Kenneth James "Kenny" Graham, American football safety
Ken Graham, American meteorologist
Kenneth Grahame (1859–1932), British writer
Kevin Graham, Canadian water polo player
Kyle "Skinny" Graham (1899–1973), Major League Baseball pitcher
Larry Graham (born 1946), American bass guitar player, member of Sly and the Family Stone
Lauren Graham (born 1967), American actress
Leonard Graham (disambiguation), multiple people
Leona Graham (born 1971), British radio presenter
Lindsey Graham (born 1955), American politician
Lollie Graham, Shetland writer
Lou Graham (born 1938), American professional golfer
Louis E. Graham (1880–1965), U.S. politician from Pennsylvania
Luke Graham (disambiguation), multiple people
Malise Graham, 1st Earl of Menteith (1406–1490), Scottish magnate
Mark Graham (disambiguation), multiple people
Martha Graham (1894–1991), American dancer and choreographer
Martin H. Graham (1926–2015), American professor of Electrical Engineering and Computer Sciences
Mary Lou Graham (born 1936), All-American Girls Professional Baseball League player 
Max Graham, Canadian DJ, composer and producer of dance music
Michael Graham (disambiguation) (also: Mike)
Moonlight Graham (1876–1965), American baseball player
Ogilvie Graham (1891–1971), Irish cricketer and British Army officer
Otto Graham (1921–2003), American football and basketball player
Patricia Graham (pilot), Australian aviator
Patrick Graham (disambiguation), multiple people
Paul Graham (disambiguation), multiple people
Peter Graham (disambiguation), multiple people
Phil Graham (1915–1963), American publisher
Ralph Graham (American football) (1910–2005), American football player and coach
Sir Reginald Graham, 3rd Baronet (1892–1980), Scottish soldier
Richard Graham (disambiguation), multiple people
Richey V. Graham (1886–1972), American politician
Robert Graham (disambiguation), multiple people
Ron Graham (disambiguation), multiple people
Ruth Bell Graham (1920–2007), American writer and philanthropist
Sam Graham, English footballer
Sam Graham (footballer, born 1874), Scottish footballer
Shawn Graham (born 1968), New Brunswick politician
Skinny Graham (outfielder) (1909–1967), American baseball player
Stan Graham (1926–2010), Canadian politician
Stanley Graham (1900–1941), New Zealand mass murderer
Stephen Graham (disambiguation), multiple people
Steve Graham, Australian Paralympic coach
Susan Graham (born 1960), American mezzo-soprano singer 
Susan L. Graham, American computer scientist
Sylvester Graham (1794–1851), American nutritionist
Ta'Quon Graham (born 1998), American football player
 Ted Graham, Baron Graham of Edmonton (1925–2020), British Labour Co-operative politician
Ted Graham (ice hockey) (1904–1979), Canadian hockey player
Thaddea Graham, Chinese-Northern Irish actress
Thomas Graham (disambiguation), multiple people
Tiny Graham (1892–1962), American baseball player
Toby Graham (1920–2013), British cross-country skier and historian
Todd Graham, American college football coach
Treveon Graham (born 1993), American basketball player
Wallace H. Graham (1910–1996), American physician
Wallace Wilson Graham, American lawyer and politician
Wayne Graham, American college baseball coach
W. S. Graham (1918–1986), Scottish poet
William Graham (disambiguation), multiple people
Winston Graham (1908–2003), English novelist
Winthrop Graham (born 1965), Jamaican athlete

See also
Duke of Montrose
Clan Graham
Graham baronets
Graham (disambiguation)
Judge Graham (disambiguation)
Justice Graham (disambiguation)
Grahame (surname)

References

English-language surnames
English toponymic surnames